Biosecurity Act may refer to:

Biosecurity Act 1993, New Zealand
Biosecurity Act 2015, Australia